North West 3 was an English Rugby Union league which was at the ninth tier of the domestic competition and was available to teams in North West England.  Promoted teams moved up to North West 2 while relegated teams dropped to either South Lancs/Cheshire 1 or North Lancs/Cumbria depending on their location.  

At the end of the 1999-2000 the division was cancelled along with North West 1, North West 2, and their counterparts North East 1, North East 2 and North East 3, due to northern league restructuring by the RFU. Most teams in North West 3 were transferred to their relevant regional leagues - South Lancs/Cheshire 1, South Lancs/Cheshire 2, North Lancs/Cumbria or the Cumbrian League depending on final league position.

Original teams
When this division was introduced in 1996 it contained the following teams:

Calder Vale - promoted from Cumbria/Lancs North (runners up)
Caldy - relegated from North West 2 (11th)
Cockermouth - relegated from North West 1 (13th)
Merseyside Police - relegated from North West 2 (9th)
Rossendale - relegated from North West 2 (10th)
Ruskin Park - promoted from Cheshire/Lancs South (champions)
Stockport - relegated from North West 2 (13th)
Wigan - relegated from North West 2 (12th)
Windermere - relegated from North West 2 (8th)
Workington - promoted from Cumbria/Lancs North (champions)

North West 3 honours

Number of league titles

Merseyside Police (1)
Rochdale (1)
Southport (1)
Wigan (1)

Notes

References

See also
 English Rugby Union Leagues
 English rugby union system
 Rugby union in England

9